Gabriella Pozzuolo-Marchi (born 28 November 1946) is a retired Italian gymnast. She competed at the 1968 Olympics in all artistic gymnastics events with the best result of 59th place on the uneven bars.

References

1946 births
Living people
Sportspeople from Genoa
Gymnasts at the 1968 Summer Olympics
Olympic gymnasts of Italy
Italian female artistic gymnasts